Catherine Cessac (born 19 August 1952 in Bordeaux) is a French musicologist and music publisher.

Biography 

Catherine Cessac studied at the University and the Conservatory of Bordeaux, and later studied musicology at the Sorbonne. From 1990 to 2003, she was the editor of the Bulletins of the "Société Marc-Antoine Charpentier". In 2004, she was commissioned by the French Ministry of Culture to organize national festivals for the 300th anniversary of the death of composer Marc-Antoine Charpentier, as well as the creation of a website on the life and work of Charpentier. Catherine Cessac is a research director at the Centre national de la recherche scientifique (CNRS) and of the workshop of the Centre de musique baroque de Versailles (CMBV). French classical music of the seventeenth and eighteenth is the main field of her studies.

In 1988, her book Marc-Antoine Charpentier received the Académie Charles-Cros prize.

Distinctions 
 1998: Chevalier de l'ordre des Arts et des Lettres
 2005: Officier de l'ordre des Arts et des Lettres
 2013: Prix des Muses in the Prix du patrimoine category, awarded by the "fondation Singer-Polignac" for Itinéraires d'André Campra
2011 : Chevalier de La Légion d'Honneur

Publications 
1988: Marc-Antoine Charpentier, second edition extended (Editions Fayard 2004)
1995: Élisabeth Jacquet de La Guerre, une femme compositeur sous le règne de Louis XIV  (Actes Sud, Arles)
1998: Louis-Nicolas Clérambault (Fayard)
2003: L'Œuvre de Daniel Danielis (1635–1696), Catalogue thématique (CNRS Éditions)
2003: (avec Manuel Couvreur), La Duchesse du Maine (1676-1753). Une Mécène à la croisée des Arts et des Siècles, éditions Fabrice Prévat, Bruxelles, 2003
2004: Molière et la musique (Nouvelles Presses Du Languedoc)
2005: Marc-Antoine Charpentier - Un musicien retrouvé (Mardaga)
2007: Les manuscrits autographes de Marc-Antoine Charpentier (Mardaga)
2007: Jean-Féry Rebel, musicien des Éléments (Paris CNRS Éditions)
2012: Itinéraires d'André Campra
2016: Les Histoires sacrées de Marc-Antoine Charpentier, Brepols
2019: Monumentale Marc-Antoine Charpentier, Musique pour les comédies de Molière, édition scientifique, (CMBV)

References

External links 
 Catherine Cessac on Centre d'études supérieures de la Renaissance
 Catherine Cessac on École Nationale des Chartes
 Catherine Cessac on Symétrie
 Publications on CAIRN
 Catherine Cessac on CNRS Éditions

20th-century French musicologists
21st-century French musicologists
Women musicologists
Music historians
Officiers of the Ordre des Arts et des Lettres
Writers from Bordeaux
1952 births
Living people
Research directors of the French National Centre for Scientific Research